Kaifi Khalil (born 2 September 1996) is a Pakistani singer-songwriter and composer based in Karachi. He rose to prominence in 2022 after his debut in Coke Studio's Balochi song "Kana Yaari". His song Kahani Suno 2.0 topped Spotify charts in Pakistan, Bangladesh and India.

Life and career
Kaifi was born and raised in Karachi's neighborhood of Lyari to a family of Baloch musicians. He lived a relatively troubled childhood with financial troubles after his father died, and frequently skipped school.

In 2015, he started his own YouTube channel and uploaded his first video in 2016. His first song was a cover of “Mani Tawe Dost,” a Balochi tune.

He used to upload covers of songs and original music by him on his YouTube channel before being discovered in 2022 by Coke Studio'''s music producer, Xulfi. He wrote and composed his verse in "Kana Yaari" three years prior to releasing it on the Coke Studio platform, singing alongside artists Eva B and Abdul Wahab Bugti.

Since its release in 2022, his Urdu language song "Kahani Suno 2.0" continues to be the top song for Spotify charts in Pakistan with 19 million streams to date. It also topped charts in Bangladesh and became a trending song in neighbouring India. The song's top countries for listeners include India, Pakistan, Bangladesh, the UK, USA and Canada. 

Its music video also secured a spot in YouTube's Top 10 Global Charts peaking at number 8, the first Pakistani music video to do so. It is also listed among the most-viewed Pakistani YouTube videos.

In 2023, he announced his first international tour in Jeddah, Saudi Arabia.

He has a vast discography with multiple songs, including Dilbar Dila Bide, Afsos, Beqaraar, Jungle Jungle, Tauba Tauba, Drog and Kadi Kaye.''

Other singles released by Kaifi include Baali Guraab (2021), Kadi Kaye (2021) and Mast (2022).

Artistry
He is recognized for putting a contemporary spin on traditional Balochi folk music with modern day music.

References

1996 births
Living people
Pakistani male singer-songwriters
Pakistani male composers
Singers from Karachi
Baloch musicians
Balochi-language singers